Alexey Chesmin (born 7 February 1986 in Elektrogorsk) is a Russian Paralympic footballer who won a silver medal during the 2008 Summer Paralympics in China.

References

External links
  (2008)
  (2012)

1986 births
Living people
Paralympic 7-a-side football players of Russia
Paralympic gold medalists for Russia
Paralympic silver medalists for Russia
Paralympic medalists in football 7-a-side
7-a-side footballers at the 2008 Summer Paralympics
7-a-side footballers at the 2012 Summer Paralympics
Medalists at the 2008 Summer Paralympics
Medalists at the 2012 Summer Paralympics
People from Moscow Oblast
Sportspeople from Moscow Oblast
21st-century Russian people